Frederick William Ricord (born in Guadeloupe, West Indies, 7 October 1819; died in Newark, New Jersey, 12 August 1897) was a noted United States author.

Biography
He was the son of physician Jean Baptiste Ricord and educator Elizabeth Ricord, was educated at Hobart and Rutgers, and studied law in Geneva, New York, but did not practice.

He taught for 12 years in Newark, New Jersey, was a member of the board of education of that city from 1852 until 1869, serving as president from 1867 to 1869. He was state superintendent of public schools of New Jersey in 1860–1863, sheriff of Essex County 1865–1867, mayor of Newark 1870–1874, and associate judge of the various Essex County courts 1875–1879.

He was long librarian of the New Jersey Historical Society. Ricord received the degree of A.M. from Rutgers in 1845 and Princeton in 1861.

Writings
He was one of the editors of the New Jersey Archives, and published:
 History of Rome (New York, 1852)
 The Youth's Grammar (1853)
 Victor Cousin, Life of Madame de Longueville, translator (1854)
 Voltaire, The Henriade, translator (1859)
 English Songs from Foreign Tongues (1879)
 Terentius, The Self-Tormentor, translator, with more English Songs (1885)

He had ready for publication The Governors of New Jersey, which gives the history of the state from its settlement to the Revolution.

Family
His brother, John Ricord, was a noted lawyer and traveler.

References

1819 births
1897 deaths
American non-fiction writers
Writers from Newark, New Jersey
Mayors of Newark, New Jersey
Rutgers University alumni
Hobart and William Smith Colleges alumni
American librarians
19th-century American politicians